Petra Štefanková is a Slovak illustrator, digital artist, designer and art director. She has worked in the animation, advertising and publishing industry.

She studied graphic design at Jozef Vydra's School of Applied Art in Bratislava in 1993–1997, visual communication at the Academy of Fine Arts and Design in Bratislava in 1997-2003 a film and TV graphics at the Academy of Arts, Architecture and Design in Prague in 2002. Additionally, she took a short course at Central Saint Martin's, University of the Arts London in 2016.

In December 2007 she won Channel 4's 4Talent Award for young creatives from all creative industries in the United Kingdom and presented her work at GRAPHITE 2007, the digital art exhibition and conference organised by the North American and Australian chapter of the ACM SIGGRAPH at the University of Western Australia in Perth. Her work was exposed widely on shows all around the world with her solo shows taking place in Bratislava, Nitra, Malacky, Berlin, Prague and Washington DC. Australian curator Andrew Chew selected her work for GAS Project exhibition 2007 along with a special guest Doze Green from NYC, one of the Top Ten Visual Artists in the world according to Stylus magazine rating. Her work has been presented by the Museum of computer art based in NYC and the Heritage Museum in Hong Kong.

In July 2007 she was selected for exhibition at Images 31: The Best Of British Illustration in London College of Communication (which repeated again in 2009) and published in 200 Best Illustrators Worldwide 2007/08 by Luerzer, Expose 6 - The Finest Digital Art in the Known Universe by Ballistic Publishing in 2008. From a thousand entrants, she was also selected to exhibit within the digital art on environment issues exhibition Common Ground 2008 running across China (with a start in Beijing) and galleries in the US in 2010.

In April 2008 at age 29 she was invited to join the Fellowship of the Royal Society of Arts in London.

In July 2008 she presented her illustrative work at ICON5 Illustration Salon in Roosevelt Hotel off Madison Avenue in New York City. Other public presentations include Les E-Magiciens, European Digital Animation festival organized by SUPINFOCOM in France in November 2008, Pecha Kucha Night in Brighton in November 2009, discussion at DOX: Centre for Contemporary Art in Prague in June 2010 and ICON6 Illustration Salon in Langham Hotel in Pasadena, CA in July 2010, ICON7 Roadshow Illustration Salon in Providence, Rhode Island, in 2012 and TEDx Bratislava 2013.

Notably, as a designer, she collaborated on an animated title sequence for the feature film Nanny McPhee and the Big Bang with Voodoodog Animation in London. The team was awarded, Silver World Medal at New York Festival, (World's Best TV and Film Awards) in 2011.

In 2012 she was part of the BOND magazine Launch event and exhibition at Saatchi Gallery in London. House of Illustration in London organised the event Illustrator's Christmas Fair, where she presented her work in December 2015. In 2015 she was also selected for the international exhibition Between Volga and Danube organised by the Russian Academy of Art in Moscow. In 2016 she took part in Prague Design Week organised at Kafka's house in the heart of Prague.

Publications include Visual Artist at Work by Michael Fleishman, Centage (2009, US), Vector Graphics and Illustration, A master class in digital image-making by Steven Withrow and Jack Harris, Rotovision (2008, UK),  Planet Alert, Revista Colectiva (2009, Costa Rica), A DGPH Project: The Ark, IdN / Systems Design, (2009, Hong Kong), 3x3 Directory (2017, 2018, USA); Drawn Vol.1 The Best Illustrators Worldwide (2017, Australia), Bézier Vol.1 The Best Vector Artists Worldwide (2017, Australia), Channel 4's 4Talent magazine 8 and 9 and many more.

Petra Štefanková is an author, designer and illustrator of children's books 'Moje malé more', self-published in 2016 and 'Čmáranica a Machuľa', published by Slovart in 2018. She has illustrated a children's book of Mária Štefánková 'My už vieme všeličo' published by Slovart in 2017. As an illustrator and author of the concept, she collaborated with her mother, a poet Aurélia Štefanková, on a book 'Neberte mi sny / Don't take my dreams from me' in 2020.

Petra is a supporter of many charity projects such as Parky Life by the agency Havas Lynx in the UK (2019), Memories in aid of Maggie's Centres by Garrick Webster (DAHRA, 2011), project Dotyky umenia of the top model Ivana Christová (Orin Panacea, 2013). She supported talented individuals from Slovakia in various projects – in media in London and by establishing an illustration agency representing Slovak and Czech illustrators abroad. She was a guest of many events, receptions and private views at the Slovak and British embassies, The Buckingham Palace Gallery, TATE Britain, the RSA House in London, Slovak Olympic House, the Foreign and Commonwealth Office in London etc. She regularly communicates with representatives of the international cultural and the art scene, diplomats, entrepreneurs as well as members of the nobility.

Petra Štefanková starred in a number of television documentaries and reportages. Portrét umelca - Petra Štefanková was filmed for television TV 213 and directed by Anton Faraonov in 2016. In 2010 she was part of a documentary series about Slovaks abroad (Slováci vo svete) directed by Branislav Mišík and the reportage was filmed at the premises of the RSA in London. Two other reportages were filmed for television RTVS as part of programmes Slovensko v obrazoch (2020) and Správy RTVS (2021). Petra Štefanková was presented live on a television programme Dámsky klub in an interview with the host Iveta Malachovská on RTVS in 2021.

On February 25, 2022 Vanity Fair magazine in the United Kingdom has published Petra Štefanková's painting in the A-list Artists section as part of their annual Hollywood issue.

External links 
Artfacts.net profile
Books on Goodreads.com
Toast by the President of the Slovak Republic Ivan Gašparovič
Article about Petra Štefanková's work on the blog of the RSA
Article about a workshop with Petra Štefanková on the blog of the RSA 
Let's be brief interview
Graphite 2007 proceedings
Illustration for the cover of the Guardian
Illustration for Dialogue review magazine
Works on the web of Museum of computer art in NYC
Article about solo show at Mala Scena Theatre (Slovak language)
Article about a solo show in Berlin at Lite-Haus
Television documentary online (Slovak language)
Laureates of the Minister of Culture of the Slovak Republic Award 2019 (Slovak language)
IMDB Filmography

References 
FLEISHMAN, Michael. The Visual Artist at Work. USA: Cengage Learning, Inc, 2008. 384 pages. .
WITHROW, Steven; HARRIS, Jack. Vector Graphics and Illustration: A Master Class in Digital Image-making. UK: Rotovision, 2008. 176 pages. .

Slovak artists
Living people
1978 births
Digital artists
Women digital artists
Art directors
Slovak illustrators
Slovak women artists
21st-century women artists
Women graphic designers
Academy of Arts, Architecture and Design in Prague alumni